"On s'attache" is a 2007 song recorded by French singer Christophe Maé. It was his debut single of his solo career, from his second album Mon paradis. Released in May 2007, the song was successful in France and Belgium (Wallonia), and hit a moderate success in Switzerland.

Song information
The music was composed by Maé and Bruno Dandrimont with lyrics by Maé and Lionel Florence, who had also previously worked for various artists such as Nolwenn Leroy, and Christophe Maé himself. The song, which deals in part with a love relationship in which the man does not want to engage in marriage, was also recorded in a live version in 2008 and was included on Maé's live album Comme à la maison, where it is the fourth track.

In 2008, "On s'attache" won a NRJ Music Awards in the category 'Francophone song of the year'.

In France, the single was directly number-one on the SNEP chart, but dropped very quickly, remaining for four weeks in the top 50 and six weeks in the top 100, because the single was released in a limited edition. On the other hand, the single was the third most downloaded one of 2007.

In Belgium (Wallonia), "On s'attache" was charted for 38 weeks in the Ultratop 40, including a peak at #4 on 16 June and 7 July 2007.

Track listings
 CD single
 "On s'attache" — 3:11
 "On s'attache" (acoustic version) — 3:01
 "On s'attache" (making-of of the video)

 Digital download
 "On s'attache" — 3:11
 "On s'attache" (live) — 5:46

Charts

Certifications

References

2007 debut singles
Christophe Maé songs
SNEP Top Singles number-one singles
Songs written by Lionel Florence
2007 songs
Warner Music Group singles